National governing bodies hold National Cyclo-cross Championships on an annual basis.  The winner is crowned national cyclo-cross champion and wears the national cycling jersey for his/her nation in races in the same category as it was won in. This means, for example, that the winner of the Men's Under-23 category cannot wear his national champion's jersey in a Men's Elite race. Most countries' national championships are held on the second weekend in January, a fortnight before the UCI Cyclo-cross World Championships.

Current champions 

For the specific pages, check out :Category:National cyclo-cross championships.

Men 

 2020/2021 national championship canceled due to COVID-19

Women 

 2020/2021 national championship canceled due to COVID-19.

See also
Dutch National Cyclo-cross Championships

United States National Cyclo-cross Championships

Belgian National Cyclo-cross Championships

French National Cyclo-cross Championships

British National Cyclo-cross Championships

Spanish National Cyclo-cross Championships

Italian National Cyclo-cross Championships

External links 
 UCI Cyclo-Cross Results

Cyclo-cross races